Juniperus communis, the common juniper, is a species of small tree or shrub in the cypress family Cupressaceae. An evergreen conifer, it has the largest geographical range of any woody plant, with a circumpolar distribution throughout the cool temperate Northern Hemisphere.

Description
Juniperus communis is very variable in form, ranging from —rarely —tall to a low, often prostrate spreading shrub in exposed locations. It has needle-like leaves in whorls of three; the leaves are green, with a single white stomatal band on the inner surface. It never attains the scale-like adult foliage of other members of the genus. It is dioecious, with male and female cones (both of which are wind pollinated) on separate plants. Male trees or shrubs naturally live longer than female trees or shrubs, a male tree or shrub can live more than 2000 years.

The fruit are berry-like cones known as juniper berries. They are initially green, ripening in 18 months to purple-black with a blue waxy coating; they are spherical,  diameter, and usually have three (occasionally six) fleshy fused scales, each scale with a single seed. The seeds are dispersed when birds eat the cones, digesting the fleshy scales and passing the hard, unwinged seeds in their droppings.

Chemistry 
The juniper berry oil is composed largely of monoterpene hydrocarbons such as α-pinene, myrcene, sabinene, limonene and β-pinene.

Subspecies

As to be expected from the wide range, J. communis is very variable, with several infraspecific taxa; delimitation between the taxa is still uncertain, with genetic data not matching morphological data well.
subsp. communis – Common juniper.
subsp. communis var. communis – Europe, most of northern Asia
subsp. communis var. depressa  – North America, Sierra Nevada in California
subsp. communis var. hemisphaerica  – Mediterranean mountains
subsp. communis var. nipponica  – Japan (status uncertain, often treated as J. rigida var. nipponica)
subsp. alpina  – alpine juniper (syn. J. c. subsp. nana, J. c. var. saxatilis Pallas, J. sibirica Burgsd.). Usually a prostrate ground-hugging shrub; leaves short, 3–8 mm; cones often larger, 7–12 mm, usually longer than the leaves; found in subarctic areas and high altitude alpine zones in temperate areas
subsp. alpina var. alpina – Greenland, Europe and Asia
subsp. alpina var. megistocarpa  – Eastern Canada (doubtfully distinct from var. alpina)
subsp. alpina var. jackii  – Western North America (doubtfully distinct from var. alpina)

Some botanists treat subsp. alpina at the lower rank of variety, in which case the correct name is J. communis var. saxatilis Pallas, though the name J. communis var. montana is also occasionally cited; others, primarily in eastern Europe and Russia, sometimes treat it as a distinct species J. sibirica Burgsd. (syn. J. nana Willd., J. alpina S.F.Gray).

Distribution and habitat
The species has the largest geographical range of any woody plant, with a circumpolar distribution throughout the cool temperate Northern Hemisphere from the Arctic south in mountains to around 30°N latitude in North America, Europe and Asia. Relict populations can be found in the Atlas Mountains of Africa.

J. communis is one of Ireland's longest established plants.

Cultivation

Juniperus communis is cultivated in the horticulture trade and used as an evergreen ornamental shrub in gardens. The following cultivars gained the Royal Horticultural Society's Award of Garden Merit in 1993:
 Juniperus communis 'Compressa' 
 Juniperus communis 'Green Carpet' (prostrate shrub)
 Juniperus communis 'Hibernica' (Irish juniper)
 Juniperus communis 'Repanda' (prostrate shrub)

Uses

Crafts

It is too small to have any general lumber usage. In Scandinavia, however, juniper wood is used for making containers for storing small quantities of dairy products such as butter and cheese, and also for making wooden butter knives. It was also frequently used for trenails in wooden shipbuilding by shipwrights for its tough properties.

In Estonia juniper wood is valued for its long lasting and pleasant aroma, very decorative natural structure of wood (growth rings) as well as good physical properties of wood due to slow growth rate of juniper and resulting dense and strong wood. Various decorative items (often eating utensils) are common in most Estonian handicraft shops and households.

According to the old tradition, on Easter Monday Kashubian (Northern Poland) boys chase girls whipping their legs gently with juniper twigs. This is to bring good fortune in love to the chased girls.

Juniper wood, especially burl wood, is frequently used to make knife handles for French pocketknives such as the Laguiole.

Culinary

Its astringent blue-black seed cones, commonly known as juniper berries, are too bitter to eat raw and are usually sold dried and used to flavour meats, sauces, and stuffings. They are generally crushed before use to release their flavour. Since juniper berries have a strong taste, they should be used sparingly. They are generally used to enhance meat with a strong flavour, such as game, including game birds, or tongue.

The cones are used to flavour certain beers and gin (the word "gin" derives from an Old French word meaning "juniper"). In Finland, juniper is used as a key ingredient in making sahti, a traditional Finnish ale. Also the Slovak alcoholic beverage Borovička and Dutch Jenever are flavoured with juniper berry or its extract.

Juniper is used in the traditional farmhouse ales of Norway, Sweden, Finland, Estonia, and Latvia. In Norway, the beer is brewed with juniper infusion instead of water, while in the other countries the juniper twigs are mainly used as filters to prevent the crushed malts from clogging the outlet of the lauter tun. The use of juniper in farmhouse brewing has been common in much of northern Europe, seemingly for a very long time.

Traditional medicine
Juniper berries have long been used as medicine by many cultures including the Navajo people. Western American tribes combined the berries of J. communis with Berberis root bark in a herbal tea. Native Americans also used juniper berries as a female contraceptive.

Medicine
Juniper leaves were found to harbor fungi with potent anti-fungal compounds, including ibrexafungerp, which is now FDA approved to treat fungal infections.

References

Further reading
  Database entry includes a brief justification of why this species is of least concern.

External links

USDA: Juniperus communis
  Jepson Manual Treatment - Juniperus communis
Juniperus communis - Photo Gallery
 Juniperus communis - information, genetic conservation units and related resources. European Forest Genetic Resources Programme (EUFORGEN)

communis
Alpine flora
Flora of North America
Flora of Europe
Flora of temperate Asia
Flora of North Africa
Dioecious plants
Least concern plants
Edible plants
Plants used in traditional Native American medicine
Plants described in 1753
Taxa named by Carl Linnaeus
Garden plants of Asia
Garden plants of Europe
Garden plants of North America
Flora of Greenland